The Gibraltar Constitution Order 2006 was taken to a referendum in Gibraltar on 30 November 2006. A coalition of groups opposing the proposal held that a majority of 60% should be required to give effect to a new Constitution, quoting other instances, but the political parties held that the result should be decided by a simple majority in favour of the new constitution. The constitution was approved by 60% of the votes anyway.

It was given effect by an Order in Council on 14 December 2006 and it came into force on 2 January 2007. According to the British government, it aimed to provide a modern and mature relationship that is not based on colonialism between Gibraltar and the United Kingdom.

Origin
In 1999, the Government of the United Kingdom invited British Dependent Territories to provide proposals for constitutional reform. A cross-party committee of the Gibraltar House of Assembly was set up to consult with interested parties and in January 2002 produced a report, which was subsequently debated and negotiated with the United Kingdom. The proposals for the reform were accepted by the British Foreign and Commonwealth Office in March 2006 and then were unanimously approved in the House of Assembly in October.

Publication procedure
Once promulgated by the Queen-in-Council, the Constitution Order was published as a set of documents:
 The Despatch, the letter under cover of which the Foreign Secretary sent the Constitution order to the Governor of Gibraltar.
 The Order in Council, which contained the preamble as main content. It also included several annexes.
 The Annexes to the Order in Council. Annex No 1 is the text of the Constitution itself; Annex No 2 contains the transitional and other provisions.

Contents
The proposed constitution had been negotiated with the British Government by a delegation representing Gibraltar, comprising the Government, the Opposition and others. The text of the proposed new Constitution had been welcomed by the House of Assembly in a motion passed unanimously with the support of both sides of the House.

Among changes introduced by the new constitution were:
 Renaming the House of Assembly to the Gibraltar Parliament.
 Renaming "Members of the House of Assembly" to "Members of Parliament" (MPs).
 Removal of the two remaining un-elected members of the House of Assembly.
 Increasing the number of elected representatives from 15 to 17, with the parliament able to legislate to increase this number.
 Decreasing the Governor's powers, and transferring some of these to elected officials.
 Modernisation of the relationship between Gibraltar and the UK, without affecting the issue of sovereignty.
 A bill of "fundamental rights and freedoms" enshrined in the constitution.

Referendum 
A referendum on the proposed new constitution order was held on 30 November 2006. The motion proposed and approved was:

The possible answers were "Yes" and "No".

Response

On colonialism and modernisation of political institutions 

Answering the complaints of Spanish Foreign Minister Miguel Ángel Moratinos, Jack Straw stated:

In the foreword of an explanatory leaflet issued by the Government of Gibraltar for the proposed new constitution, Chief Minister Peter Caruana said that he: 

He further added: 

Caruana also stated:

On independence 
At the same time, the UK government, while fully supporting the right of self-determination for Gibraltarians, excluded the possibility of independence for Gibraltar, referring to the Treaty of Utrecht:

However, the UK government acknowledged that Gibraltar "does not share the view that this constraint exists and that their acceptance of this Constitution is on that basis".

Criticisms
In spite of the unanimous support from all the political parties represented in the House of Assembly, there was a significant "No" movement. The reasons were diverse, but mainly related to two aspects: while some electors could have felt that the commitment to retaining British sovereignty was not sufficiently secure, other could have believed that the new constitution were not advanced enough in allowing the exercise of the right to self-determination. The minority rights pressure group Equality Rights GGR, have called it "gravely deficient" and a "missed opportunity", for failing to fully incorporate the European Convention on Human Rights.

The Self Determination for Gibraltar Group also criticised the constitution and campaigned for a No vote in the constitutional referendum. They said in a press release that the new constitution "is not the act of self-determination which will decolonise us" and that it "is as colonial as its 1964 and 1969 predecessors."

Joe Bossano, Leader of the Opposition, criticised the failure to phrase the preamble in a way that supported the maximum possible level of self-government.

Result
Turnout was 60.4%, the lowest at a general election or referendum for 25 years. This was much lower than the 87.9% achieved for the 2002 referendum on shared sovereignty but comparable to the 58% for the election for the European Parliament. 60.24% of votes cast were for the order, 37.75% of votes were against.

See also
Constitution of Gibraltar
Politics of Gibraltar

References

External links
 , Constitution of Gibraltar on Gibraltar.gov.gi
 Draft government legislation replacing references to "House of Assembly" with "Gibraltar Parliament"

2006 elections in Gibraltar
2006 in British law
2006 referendums
Constitutions of country subdivisions
Orders in Council
Referendums in Gibraltar
November 2006 events in Europe